After the Raid is a 2019 documentary film directed by Rodrigo Reyes. The premise revolves around a meatpacking plant in Grainger County, Tennessee where 97 undocumented workers were arrested during a raid in 2018.

Release
After the Raid was released on December 19, 2019, on Netflix.

References

External links

 
 

2019 documentary films
2019 films
Netflix original documentary films